Image differencing is an image processing technique used to determine changes between images. The difference between two images is calculated by finding the difference between each pixel in each image, and generating an image based on the result. For this technique to work, the two images must first be aligned so that corresponding points coincide, and their photometric values must be made compatible, either by careful calibration, or by post-processing (using color mapping). The complexity of the pre-processing needed before differencing varies with the type of image.

Image differencing techniques are commonly used in astronomy to locate objects that fluctuate in brightness or move against the star field.

The Hutchinson metric can be used to "measure of the discrepancy between two images for use in fractal image processing".

See also 
 Blink comparator
 Difference matte
 Image stabilization

Sources and notes

External links 
 Sussex Computer Vision webpage: Use of motion information in computer vision

Image processing